The following lists events that happened during the year 1995 in Bosnia and Herzegovina.

Incumbents
President: Alija Izetbegović
Prime Minister: Haris Silajdžić

Events

July
July 11 - Srebrenica massacre occurred during the Bosnian War.

December
December 14 - end to the Bosnian War (started April 6, 1992).

 
Years of the 20th century in Bosnia and Herzegovina
1990s in Bosnia and Herzegovina
Bosnia and Herzegovina
Bosnia and Herzegovina